Landmark cases may refer to:

 Lists of landmark court decisions
 List of landmark court decisions in India
 List of landmark court decisions in the United States
 List of landmark United Kingdom House of Lords cases
 Landmark cases of the Supreme Court of Japan
 Landmark Cases: Historic Supreme Court Decisions, a C-SPAN series
 Landmark Cases in the Law of Contract, a 2008 book edited by Charles Mitchell and Paul Mitchell
 Landmark Cases in Equity, a 2012 book edited by Charles Mitchell and Paul Mitchell
 Landmark Cases in Family Law, a 2011 book edited by Stephen Gilmore, Jonathan Herring, and Rebecca Probert 
 Landmark Cases in the Law of Tort, a 2010 book edited by Charles Mitchell and Paul Mitchell
 Landmark Cases in the Law of Restitution, a 2006 book edited by Charles Mitchell and Paul Mitchell